The LG Optimus Slider (also known as "Gelato Q") is an Android-powered cellphone developed by LG Electronics, Inc. It was first released on October 17, 2011 on Virgin Mobile USA in the United States. It was later released by Virgin Mobile USA as the LG Optimus Slider VM701.

See also
Galaxy Nexus
List of Android devices

References

Android (operating system) devices
LG Electronics mobile phones
Mobile phones introduced in 2011